Ullock railway station was built by the Whitehaven, Cleator and Egremont Railway. It served the village of Ullock, Cumbria, England.

History

The station opened on 2 April 1866. The owning company was taken over by the LNWR and Furness Railway in 1879 as a Joint Line, whereafter the northern section through Ullock was usually worked by the LNWR.

Passenger traffic consisted of three trains a day in each direction, with an extra on Whitehaven market day and none on Sundays. From opening, northbound passenger trains terminated at Marron Junction station where passengers changed for destinations beyond. In 1897 Marron Junction station closed, with trains running west through to Workington Main thereafter, a much better arrangement for most passengers. Passengers who would otherwise have changed at Marron Junction to head east to Brigham or beyond simply changed at the first stop after Marron Junction - Camerton.

Goods traffic typically consisted of a two daily turns Up and Down.

Mineral traffic was the dominant flow, typically six loaded and six empty through to Workington, though this was subject to considerable fluctuation with trade cycles. Stations and signalling along the line north of Rowrah were changed during the Joint regime to conform to LNWR standards.

In 1879, at the height of West Cumberland's ironworks expansion, a new line was built from just north of Ullock through Distington to Whitehaven via Parton. This line's dominant purposes were to carry ore to Distington and metal beyond. This line became known as the Gilgarran Branch.

The station closed on 13 April 1931 when normal passenger traffic ended along the line. Goods trains continued to pass through the station until 1954. An enthusiasts' special ran through on 5 September 1954. After scant occasional use the line was abandoned in 1960 and subsequently lifted.

Afterlife
In 2013 the course of the line through the village was partly accessible via a public footpath.

See also

 Cockermouth and Workington Railway
 Cockermouth, Keswick and Penrith Railway

References

Sources

Further reading

External links
Map of the line with photos in RAILSCOT
The station on overlain OS maps surveyed from 1898 in National Library of Scotland
The closed station on a 1948 OS Map in npe maps
The station in Rail Map Online
The railways of Cumbria in Cumbrian Railways Association
Photos of Cumbrian railways in Cumbrian Railways Association
The railways of Cumbria in Railways of Cumbria
Cumbrian Industrial History in Cumbria Industrial History Society
The line's and station's Engineer's Line References in Railway Codes
Furness Railtour using many West Cumberland lines 5 September 1954 in Six Bells Junction
A video tour-de-force of the region's closed lines in Cumbria Film Archive
1882 RCH Diagram showing the station, see page 173 of the pdf in Google

Disused railway stations in Cumbria
Railway stations in Great Britain opened in 1866
Railway stations in Great Britain closed in 1931
Dean, Cumbria